Kalri (formerly Kul Kalri) is a village located at distance of 56Km away from Jhang, on the western bank of the Chenab River in Chiniot, Punjab, Pakistan.

Government 
GHS is well Known Institute in Kalri Tehsil Lalain District Chiniot with EMIS code 33430030.Here are so many private Sector Schools But GHS Kalri has produced Highly Educated Doctors, Engineer's students.

Staff 
  MUhammad akhtar	SST(IT)
  Hakim khan  SST(Late)
 Rustam ali PST
 Nasir ahmad	PST
  Irshad Ahmad	PST
 Ghulam  Murtaza	

Villages in Chiniot District